Kansha!!!!! - Thank You for 20 Years New and Best (Japanese: 感謝!!!!! -Thank You for 20 Years New and Best) is the fourth greatest hits album by Japanese-American singer-songwriter Ai. It was released on November 6, 2019, through EMI Records and Universal Music Group. Released in two physical configurations, disc one contains three new songs and six re-recorded gospel tracks of her previous hit singles while disc two contains material previously not available outside of Asia. The album served as Ai's first international compilation release.

Kansha!!!!! - Thank You for 20 Years New and Best debuted and peaked at number 29 on the Japan Oricon weekly albums chart, charting for nine weeks.

Background and release 
To celebrate her twenty-year anniversary in the music industry and the then upcoming 2020 Summer Olympics, Ai traveled to Los Angeles, California to record new material, which later was revealed to be It's All Me, Vol. 1 (2020) and It's All Me, Vol. 2 (2021). While recording new material, Ai recorded gospel arrangements of her previously released hit singles. Recording too many songs, the staff of Ai's label, EMI Records, decided to split her recordings into different releases.

The album was announced by Universal on September 17, 2019 along with a series of projects by Ai. The album was teased in a video posted by Ai on her social media, including the album cover, title and tracks later that month.

Promotion 
To promote the album, Ai embarked on a national tour in Japan with a gospel choir from November 2019 to December 2019.

Commercial performance 
Kansha!!!!! - Thank You for 20 Years New and Best debuted and peaked at number 29 on the Japan Oricon weekly albums chart for the week of November 18, 2019. The album continued to stay on the chart for nine weeks. On the Billboard Japan Hot Albums chart, the album debuted and peaked at number 28.

Track listing 
Credits adapted from Tidal and official album profile.  All tracks written by Ai Uemura unless noted.

Charts

References 

2019 compilation albums
Compilation albums by Japanese artists
Compilation albums by American artists
Japanese-language compilation albums
Ai (singer) compilation albums
Universal Music Group compilation albums
EMI Records compilation albums
Albums produced by Ai (singer)